Justine Henin-Hardenne was the defending champion, but withdrew from the tournament due to a back injury.

Seeds

Draw

Finals

Top half

Bottom half

JandS Cup